(born December 25, 1984 as Akihiro Yamamoto) is a former sumo wrestler from Kazusa, Nagasaki, Japan. He was a jūryō division champion in 2012. The highest rank he has reached was maegashira 2. He is now a coach at Sakaigawa stable.

Early life and sumo background
During his school years, he practiced judo. On graduating from high school, through the efforts of a former teacher, he made contact with Nakadachi (later Sakaigawa) stable and was accepted.  His ring debut was in January 2003.

Career

Sadanofuji spent over seven years in the lower divisions, spending a significant amount of time in all but the lowest division.  He spent the bulk of his career in the third makushita division, posting largely 4–3 and 3–4 records.  In the March 2009 tournament he achieved a 6–1 record and participated in an eight wrestler playoff for the makushita championship. He won against his first two opponents in the playoff, but ultimately lost the championship to Tokushinhō in the final bout of the playoff.  Following this, his sumo grew more consistent and over the next five tournaments he achieved strong winning records in all but one tournament.  In March 2010 he finally reached the second jūryō division.  Two losing tournaments put him back in makushita for one tournament, but he was back up again for the following September 2010 tournament.  After one more year in jūryō he was promoted to the top-tier makuuchi division.  
 
Sadanofuji produced a bare majority of wins in his first two top division tournaments, but then had four successive make-koshi or losing scores, which saw him demoted back to jūryō. However, he made a strong comeback in the November 2012 tournament, winning his first yūshō or tournament championship with a 14–1 record and earning immediate promotion back to makuuchi.  He was in the top division for eight consecutive tournaments until being demoted for the May 2014 tournament. In 2015 he established himself as a top division regular, recording his best score to date of 10–5 in the July 2015 tournament, which saw him ranked among the top maegashira for the first time. In September however, wrestling at maegashira 2 he lost his first thirteen matches before salvaging wins in the last two days to end with a 2–13 record. He was demoted from the top division after scoring only 4–11 in the following tournament in November 2015. He re-appeared in makuuchi in July 2016 but was unable to stay longer than a single tournament. After scoring only 4–11 and 2–13 in the jūryō division in September and November 2016 he was relegated to the makushita division for the January 2017 tournament, losing sekitori status for the first time since 2010. He withdrew from the March tournament with injury and was relegated to sandanme for the first time since 2006.

Retirement from sumo
Sadanofuji retired after the May 2017 tournament. He stayed with the Japan Sumo Association as a coach at his stable, initially under the borrowed elder name of Nakamura Oyakata held by Yoshikaze. His danpatsu-shiki, or retirement ceremony, was held at the Ryogoku Kokugikan on September 2, 2017, with around 300 people taking a cut of his hair. In August 2019 he switched to the Yamashina elder name, previously used by former komusubi Ōnishiki. When that was needed by his retiring former stablemate Toyohibiki in June 2021, he switched to the Dekiyama name.

Personal life
Sadanofuji was the tsukebito of the upper division wrestler Iwakiyama for many years, but in 2009 his coach, seeing his potential, released him from his duties so he could concentrate on his sumo. His younger brother Koki joined his stable in 2009 under the shikona Obamaumi (later Sadanoryu) and reached a highest rank of makushita 33 in March 2019, retiring in September 2021.

Sadanofuji was the first wrestler in makuuchi since Chiyonofuji to have five characters in his ring name.

Sadanofuji announced his engagement at a press conference in June 2013. The wedding reception was held the following February, and the couple's first child was born in January 2015.

Fighting style
Sadnofuji was a pusher–thruster who was not keen on fighting on the mawashi or belt. His most common winning kimarite was oshi dashi, a straightforward push out.

Career record

See also
List of sumo tournament second division champions
Glossary of sumo terms
List of heaviest sumo wrestlers
List of past sumo wrestlers
List of sumo elders

References

External links
 

1984 births
Living people
Japanese sumo wrestlers
Sumo people from Nagasaki Prefecture